The 25th PMPC Star Awards for Television was held on Tuesday night, November 22, 2011, at Newport Performing Arts Theater, Resorts World Manila in Pasay, Manila and broadcast over ABS-CBN Channel 2 on November 27, 2011 (on Sunday's Best). The ceremony was hosted by Piolo Pascual, Shamcey Supsup, Richard Gomez and Dawn Zulueta and directed by Al Quinn. This is the Silver Anniversary of the TV award giving body with the theme of ”tribute to musical variety shows” (the past 25 years).

Awards 
These are the nominations for the 25th Star Awards. The winners are in bold at the top of each list.

Best Educational Program
Matanglawin (ABS-CBN 2)AHA! (GMA 7)
Born To Be Wild (GMA 7)
Quickfire (GMA News TV)
Salamat Dok! (ABS-CBN 2)

Best Educational Program HostKim Atienza - Matanglawin (ABS-CBN 2)Drew Arellano - AHA! (GMA 7)
Ramon "Bong" Revilla, Jr. - Kap's Amazing Stories (GMA 7)
Kiko Rustia and Doc Ferds Recio - Born To Be Wild (GMA 7)
Bernadette Sembrano - Salamat Dok! (ABS-CBN 2)

Best Travel ShowTrip na Trip (ABS-CBN 2)Asenso Pinoy (NBN 4)
Estranghero (UNTV 37)
Landmarks (Net 25)
Weekend Getaway (GMA News TV)

Best Travel Show HostKat de Castro, Jason Gainza, Franzen Fajardo, Kian Kazemi - Trip na Trip (ABS-CBN 2)Francis Cardona - Asenso Pinoy (NBN 4)
Faye de Castro - Landmarks (Net 25)
Drew Arellano - Weekend Getaway (GMA News TV)
Atty. Reggie Tungol, Atty. Wilhelm Soriano, Lyn Perez - Estranghero (UNTV 37)

Best Lifestyle ShowUs Girls (Studio 23)Urban Zone (ABS-CBN 2)
Fashbook (GMA News TV)
CHInoyTV (Net 25)

Best Lifestyle Show HostAngel Aquino, Iya Villania, Cheska Garcia-Kramer - Us Girls (Studio 23)Willord Chua, Jayson Kiong, Dorenet Yu, Norman Ong, Shirley Chiu, *Sherine Koa, Katherine Ordonez - CHInoyTV (Net 25)
Solenn Heussaff - Fashbook (GMA News TV)
Daphne Oseña-Paez - Urban Zone (ABS-CBN 2)

Best Morning ShowUmagang Kay Ganda (ABS-CBN 2)Unang Hirit (GMA 7)
Good Morning Kuya (UNTV 37)
Sapul! (TV 5)
Homepage (Net 25)

Best Morning Show HostAnthony Taberna, Bernadette Sembrano, Alex Santos, Iya Villania, Donita Rose, Winnie Cordero, Andrei Felix, Venus Raj - Umagang Kay Ganda (ABS-CBN 2)Arnold Clavio, Rhea Santos, Suzie Entrata-Abrera, Lyn Ching, Connie Sison, Pia Arcangel, Susan Enriquez, Drew Arellano, Luane Dy, Monica Verallo - Unang Hirit (GMA 7)
Daniel Razon, Rene Jose, Atty. Wilhelm Soriano, Nina Taduran, Lola Sela Bungangera, Beth Santiago, Lea Ylagan, Lyn Perez - Good Morning Kuya (UNTV 37)
Erwin Tulfo, Martin Andanar, Lourd de Veyra, Shawn Yao, Atty. Mike Templo - Sapul (TV 5)
Eunice Marino, Weng dela Fuente, Onin Miranda, Ellaine Fuentes - Homepage (Net 25)

Best Youth-Oriented ShowReel Love Presents: Tween Hearts (GMA 7)Bagets (TV 5)
Good Vibes (ABS-CBN 2)

Best New Male TV PersonalityDerick Monasterio -  Reel Love Presents: Tween Hearts (GMA 7)Teejay Marquez -  Reel Love Presents: Tween Hearts (GMA 7)Diego Loyzaga - Mara Clara  (ABS-CBN 2)
Hiro Piralta - Reel Love Presents: Tween Hearts (GMA 7)
Luigi Revilla - Koreana (GMA 7)
Alden Richards - Alakdana (GMA 7)

Best New Female TV PersonalityJillian Ward - Trudis Liit (GMA 7)Ritz Azul - Mga Nagbabagang Bulaklak (TV 5)
Eula Caballero - Bagets (TV 5)
Bianca Manalo - Juanita Banana (ABS-CBN 2)
Mutya Orquia - Mutya (ABS-CBN 2)

Best Horror or Fantasy ProgramSpooky Nights Presents: Bampirella (GMA 7)Inday Wanda (TV 5)
Midnight DJ (TV 5)
Pidol's Wonderland  (TV 5)
Wansapanataym (ABS-CBN 2)

Best Public Affairs ProgramThe Bottomline with Boy Abunda (ABS-CBN 2)Bawal Ang Pasaway Kay Mareng Winnie (GMA News TV)
Brigada (GMA News TV)
Dong Puno Kalibre 41' (Aksyon TV)
Pollwatch (UNTV 37)
Power House (GMA News TV)

Best Public Affairs Program HostBoy Abunda - Bottomline (ABS-CBN 2)Atty. George Garcia, Jocos Castigador - Pollwatch (UNTV 37)
Winnie Monsod - Bawal Ang Pasaway Kay Mareng Winnie (GMA News TV)
Dong Puno - Dong Puno Kalibre 41 (Aksyon TV)
Jessica Soho - Brigada (GMA News TV)
Mel Tiangco - Power House (GMA News TV)

Best Magazine ShowRated K (ABS-CBN 2)Ang Pinaka (GMA News TV)
Failon Ngayon (ABS-CBN 2)
Kapuso Mo, Jessica Soho (GMA 7)
Tribe (Net 25)

Best Magazine Show HostKorina Sanchez - Rated K (ABS-CBN 2)Ted Failon - Failon Ngayon (ABS-CBN 2)
Rovilson Fernandez - Ang Pinaka (GMA News TV)
Jessica Soho - Kapuso Mo, Jessica Soho (GMA 7)
Christopher Wong, Nicole Facal - Tribe (Net 25)

Best Children ShowArt Angel (GMA 7)I Got It! (ABS-CBN 2)
Kawan Ng Cordero (UNTV 37)
Tropang Potchi (GMA 7)

Best Children Show HostTonipet Gaba and Roxanne Barcelo - Art Angel (GMA 7)Archie Alemania - I Got It! (ABS-CBN 2)
Julian Trono, Ella Cruz, Sabrina Man, Gabriela Cruz, Bianca Umali - Tropang Potchi (GMA 7)
Blanca Santiago, James Salamaca, Eric Cabobos - Kawan Ng Cordero (UNTV 37)

Best Documentary Programi-Witness (GMA 7)Journo (TV 5)
Krusada (ABS-CBN 2)
Reporter's Notebook (GMA 7)
SOCO: Scene of the Crime Operatives (ABS-CBN 2)

Best Documentary Program HostKara David, Jay Taruc, Howie Severino, Sandra Aguinaldo - i-Witness (GMA 7)Luchi Cruz-Valdes - Journo (TV 5)
Karen Davila, Abner Mercado, Bernadette Sembrano - The Correspondents (ABS-CBN 2)
Ces Oreña-Drilon - I Survived (ABS-CBN 2)
Maki Pulido, Jiggy Manicad - Reporter's Notebook (GMA 7)

Best Documentary SpecialPluma: Rizal, Ang Dakilang Manunulat (GMA News TV)Anatomy Of A Disaster (GMA 7)
Banal (ABS-CBN 2)
Climate Change (UNTV 37)
EDSA: Sulyap Sa Kasaysayan (ABS-CBN 2)

Best Public Service ProgramBitag (UNTV 37)Imbestigador (GMA 7)
Public Atorni (TV 5)
Wish Ko Lang (GMA 7)
XXX: Exklusibong, Explosibong, Exposé (ABS-CBN 2)

Best Public Service Program HostAtty. Presida Acosta - Public Atorni (TV5)Mike Enriquez - Imbestigador (GMA 7)
Vicky Morales - Wish Ko Lang (GMA 7)
Ben Tulfo -Bitag (UNTV 37)
Pinky Webb, Julius Babao, Anthony Taberna - XXX: Exklusibong, Explosibong, Exposé (ABS-CBN 2)

Best News Program24 Oras (GMA 7)TV Patrol (ABS-CBN 2)
Saksi (GMA 7)
TV Patrol Weekend (ABS-CBN 2)
Bandila (ABS-CBN 2)
State of the Nation with Jessica Soho (GMA News TV)

Best Male NewscasterAnthony Taberna - Iba-Balita ni Anthony Taberna (Studio 23)Ted Failon - TV Patrol (ABS-CBN 2)
Julius Babao - TV Patrol (ABS-CBN 2)
Mike Enriquez - 24 Oras (GMA 7)
Noli de Castro - TV Patrol (ABS-CBN 2)
Alex Santos - TV Patrol Weekend (ABS-CBN 2)

Best Female NewscasterVicky Morales - Saksi (GMA 7)Mel Tiangco - 24 Oras (GMA 7)
Korina Sanchez - TV Patrol (ABS-CBN 2)
Karen Davila - TV Patrol (ABS-CBN 2)
Kara David - News to Go (GMA News TV)
Jessica Soho - State of the Nation with Jessica Soho (GMA News TV)

Best Talent Search ProgramShowtime (ABS-CBN 2)Talentadong Pinoy (TV5)Star Circle Quest for the Next Kiddie Superstars (ABS-CBN 2)
Star Power: Sharon's Search for the Next Female Pop Superstar (ABS-CBN 2)
Danz Showdown (GMA 7)
Star Factor (TV 5)

Best Talent Search Program HostLuis Manzano and Billy Crawford - Pilipinas Got Talent (ABS-CBN 2)Ryan Agoncillo - Talentadong Pinoy (TV 5)
KC Concepcion - Star Circle Quest for the Next Kiddie Superstars (ABS-CBN 2)
Sharon Cuneta - Star Power: Sharon's Search for the Next Female Pop Superstar (ABS-CBN 2)
Anne Curtis, Vhong Navarro, Vice Ganda, Kim Atienza, Billy Crawford, Karylle, Jugs and Teddy - Showtime (ABS-CBN 2)

Best Game ShowPanahon Ko 'to!: Ang Game Show ng Buhay Ko (ABS-CBN 2)Asar Talo Lahat Panalo! (GMA 7)
Celebrity Cook-Off (TV 5)
Lucky Numbers (TV 5)
Twist and Shout (ABS-CBN 2)

Best Game Show Host
Luis Manzano, Billy Crawford - Panahon Ko 'to!: Ang Game Show ng Buhay Ko (ABS-CBN 2)
Ogie Alcasid, Michael V. - Hole In The Wall (GMA 7)
Kris Aquino - The Price Is Right (ABS-CBN 2)
Edu Manzano - Asar Talo Lahat Panalo (GMA 7)Vic Sotto - Who Wants To Be A Millionaire (TV 5)Best Celebrity Talk Show MOMents  (Net 25)Love ni Mister, Love ni Misis (GMA 7)
Simply KC (ABS-CBN 2)
Spoon (Net 25)
Tonight with Arnold Clavio (GMA News TV)

Best Celebrity Talk Show HostJanice de Belen - Spoon (Net 25)Arnold Clavio - Tonight with Arnold Clavio (GMA News TV)
KC Concepcion - Simply KC (ABS-CBN 2)
Gladys Reyes - Moments (Net 25)
Carmina Villaroel, Zoren Legaspi - Love ni Mister, Love ni Misis (GMA 7)

Best Showbiz-Oriented ShowThe Buzz (ABS-CBN 2)Paparazzi (TV 5)
Showbiz Central (GMA 7)
SNN: Showbiz News Ngayon (ABS-CBN 2)
Startalk (GMA 7)

Best Male Showbiz-Oriented Show HostLuis Manzano - E-Live (ABS-CBN 2)Joey de Leon - Startalk (GMA 7)
Raymond Gutierrez - Showbiz Central (GMA 7)
Ricky Lo - Startalk (GMA 7)
Tim Yap - Tweetbiz (GMA News TV)

Best Female Showbiz-Oriented Show HostCristy Fermin - Paparazzi (TV 5)Bianca Gonzales - SNN: Showbiz News Ngayon (ABS-CBN 2)
Charlene Gonzales - The Buzz (ABS-CBN 2)
Toni Gonzaga - The Buzz (ABS-CBN 2)
Pia Guanio - Showbiz Central (GMA 7)

Best Gag ShowBubble Gang (GMA 7)Banana Split (ABS-CBN 2)
Goin' Bulilit (ABS-CBN 2)
Usapang Lalake (Studio 23)
Wow, Me Ganon! (TV 5)
Wow, Mali! (TV 5)

Best Variety ShowWilling Willie (TV5)Comedy Bar (GMA 7)
Happy Yipee Yehey! (ABS-CBN 2)
Pilipinas Win Na Win (ABS-CBN 2)
Shoutout! (ABS-CBN 2)

Best Musical Variety ShowASAP Rocks (ABS-CBN 2)Party Pilipinas (GMA 7)
P.O.5 (TV 5)
Sharon (ABS-CBN 2)
Walang Tulugan with the Master Showman (GMA 7)

Best Male TV HostAllan K. - Eat Bulaga! (GMA 7)Joey de Leon - Eat Bulaga! (GMA 7)
Luis Manzano - ASAP Rocks (ABS-CBN 2)
Piolo Pascual - ASAP Rocks (ABS-CBN 2)
Vic Sotto - Eat Bulaga! (GMA 7)

Best Female TV HostToni Gonzaga - ASAP Rocks (ABS-CBN 2)Sharon Cuneta - Sharon (ABS-CBN 2)
Eugene Domingo - Comedy Bar (GMA 7)
Sarah Geronimo - ASAP Rocks (ABS-CBN 2)
Regine Velasquez - Party Pilipinas (GMA 7)

Best Drama Mini-SeriesAgimat: Mga Alamat Ni Ramon Revilla Presents Kapitan Inggo (ABS-CBN 2)Love Bug Presents: The Last Romance (GMA 7)
Your Song Presents: Iingatan Ka (ABS-CBN 2)

Best Daytime Drama SeriesLittle Star (GMA 7)Alakdana (GMA 7)
Koreana (GMA 7)
Precious Hearts Romance Presents: Alyna (ABS-CBN 2)
Precious Hearts Romance Presents: Impostor (ABS-CBN 2)

Best Comedy ShowPepito Manaloto (GMA 7)Iskul Bukol (TV 5)
M3: Malay Mo Ma-develop (ABS-CBN 2)
Mommy Elvie @ 18 (GMA News TV)
Show Me Da Manny (GMA 7)

Best Comedy ActorOgie Alcasid - Bubble Gang (GMA 7)Jason Gainza - Banana Split (ABS-CBN 2)
Pooh- Banana Split (ABS-CBN 2)
Michael V. - Bubble Gang (GMA 7)
Ariel Villasanta - Mommy Elvie @ 18 (GMA News TV)

Best Comedy ActressAi-Ai de las Alas - M3: Malay Mo Ma-develop (ABS-CBN 2)Angelica Panganiban - Banana Split (ABS-CBN 2)
Rufa Mae Quinto - Bubble Gang (GMA 7)
Pokwang - Banana Split (ABS-CBN 2)
Mommy Elvie Villasanta - Mommy Elvie @ 18 (GMA News TV)

Best Drama AnthologyUntold Stories Mula Sa Face To Face (TV 5)Maynila (GMA 7)
Star Confessions (TV 5)

Best Primetime TV SeriesMinsan Lang Kita Iibigin (ABS-CBN 2)Imortal (ABS-CBN 2)
Ilumina (GMA 7)
Magkaribal (ABS-CBN 2)
Noah (ABS-CBN 2)

Best Single Performance by an ActorEnchong Dee - "Parol" episode, Maalaala Mo Kaya (ABS-CBN 2)John Arcilla - "Krus" episode, Maalaala Mo Kaya (ABS-CBN 2)
JM de Guzman - "Pasaporte" episode, Maalaala Mo Kaya (ABS-CBN 2)
Sid Lucero - "Pinwheel" episode, Maalaala Mo Kaya (ABS-CBN 2)
Jay Manalo - "Wedding Ring" episode, Maalaala Mo Kaya (ABS-CBN 2)
Coco Martin - "Silbato" episode, Maalaala Mo Kaya (ABS-CBN 2)
Dominic Ochoa - "TV" episode, Maalaala Mo Kaya (ABS-CBN 2)

Best Single Performance by an ActressAi-Ai de las Alas - "Krus" episode, Maalaala Mo Kaya (ABS-CBN 2)Alessandra De Rossi - "Pera" episode, Maalaala Mo Kaya (ABS-CBN 2)
Helen Gamboa - "Parol" episode, Maalaala Mo Kaya (ABS-CBN 2)
Rio Locsin - "Silbato" episode, Maalaala Mo Kaya (ABS-CBN 2)
Aiko Melendez - "TV" episode, Maalaala Mo Kaya (ABS-CBN 2)
Gina Pareño - "Manika" episode, Maalaala Mo Kaya (ABS-CBN 2)
Snooky Serna - "Manika" episode, Maalaala Mo Kaya (ABS-CBN 2)

Best Drama ActorCoco Martin - Minsan Lang Kita Iibigin (ABS-CBN 2)John Lloyd Cruz - Imortal (ABS-CBN 2)
Dingdong Dantes - Endless Love (GMA 7)
Jhong Hilario - Mara Clara (ABS-CBN 2)
Piolo Pascual - Noah (ABS-CBN 2)
Derek Ramsay - Magkaribal (ABS-CBN 2)
Jericho Rosales - Green Rose (ABS-CBN 2)

Best Drama ActressGretchen Barretto - Magkaribal (ABS-CBN 2)Bea Alonzo - Magkaribal (ABS-CBN 2)
Amy Austria-Ventura - Minsan Lang Kita Iibigin (ABS-CBN 2)
Angel Aquino - Magkaribal (ABS-CBN 2)
Anne Curtis - Green Rose (ABS-CBN 2)
Angel Locsin - Imortal (ABS-CBN 2)
Lorna Tolentino - Minsan Lang Kita Iibigin (ABS-CBN 2)

Best TV StationABS-CBN 2AksyonTV
ETC 9
GMA 7
GMA News TV 11
IBC-13
NBN-4
Net 25
Studio 23
TV5
UNTV 37

Sexiest Celebrity of the Night
Male - Luis Manzano

Faces of the Night
Male – Piolo Pascual
Female – KC Concepcion

Stars of the Night
Male – Coco Martin
Female – Toni Gonzaga

Special AwardeesNora Aunor: Longest Running Musical Variety Show in Philippine Television History (Superstar)German Moreno: Master Star BuilderBoy Abunda: Hall of Fame as Best Male Showbiz-Oriented Show Host (ABS-CBN)Maalaala Mo Kaya: Hall of Fame as Best Drama Anthology (ABS-CBN)
Susan Roces: Ading Fernando Lifetime Achievement Award 
Jessica Soho: Excellence in Broadcasting Lifetime Achievement Award

References 

PMPC Star Awards for Television